"Say Something New" is a 2004 single by The Concretes.

Track listing
"Say Something New"
"Forces"
"Sugar"
"Miss You"

Release history
CD-single LFCD009, Scandinavian release
CD-promo LFCDDJ010, UK promo
CD-single LFCD010, UK release
12" vinyl, LFE010, UK release

Charts

References

2004 singles
2004 songs